Area C was one of the eight district electoral areas (DEA) which existed in Belfast, Northern Ireland from 1973 to 1985. Located in the south of the city, the district elected six members to Belfast City Council and contained the wards of Finaghy; Malone; Stranmillis; University; Upper Malone; and Windsor. The DEA largely formed part of the Belfast South constituency.

History
The area was created for the 1973 local government elections, combining the whole of the former Windsor ward with most of the former Cromac ward, parts of the Saint Anne's ward and parts of the former Lisburn Rural District. It was abolished for the 1985 local government elections. The University ward (which was renamed Botanic in 1985) and Stranmillis wards became part of a new Laganbank DEA, while the remaining four wards joined the Blackstaff ward, formerly part of Area F, in the new Balmoral DEA.

Results

1973

1977

1981

References

Former District Electoral Areas of Belfast
1973 establishments in Northern Ireland
1985 disestablishments in Northern Ireland